Hotel du Lac is a television version of the 1984 Booker prize-winning novel by Anita Brookner. It stars Anna Massey and Denholm Elliott and was released in 1986 as an episode of the BBC's Screen Two series. It was directed by Giles Foster, produced by Sue Birtwistle with music by Carl Davis and cinematography by Kenneth MacMillan.

It aired in the UK on 2 March 1986.

Plot synopsis
A romance novelist, Edith Hope (who writes under the name Vanessa Wilde) goes to stay at a Swiss Hotel on a lakeside to get away from an ill-fated romance with David, a married auctioneer and having jilted another man on the steps of the wedding venue to the disgust of her friends. At the hotel she writes letters to her ex-lover David, which tell the story of their relationship, but they are never sent. Also staying at the hotel are the gauche, flamboyantly wealthy, but vulgar Iris Pusey and her middle aged daughter Jennifer, who is somewhat man-hungry; seducing the hotel staff and fellow guest Mr. Neville. Edith is befriended by Monica, the wife of a British diplomat with the EU, who is there for health reasons. Spurning Jennifer's attentions, Mr. Neville woos Edith and he proposes marriage. Edith turns him down when she realises he is still sleeping with Jennifer. She writes one last time to David to tell him she is returning to London; the only one of her letters she posts.

Cast
Anna Massey as Edith Hope
Denholm Elliott as Philip Neville
Googie Withers as Mrs. Pusey
Julia McKenzie as Jennifer Pusey
Patricia Hodge as Monica
Irene Handl as Madame de Bonneuil
Barry Foster as David Simmonds
Geoffrey Chater as George Webb

Production
It was filmed at the Park Hotel, Vitznau on Lake Lucerne.

Reception
The TV play was nominated for nine BAFTA Awards and won three for Best Actress (Anna Massey), Best Film Editor (Dick Allen) and Best Single Drama (Sue Birtwistle and Giles Foster). One review pointed out that while there were some significant differences from the original book, the adaptation “does, finally, capture the spirit of the novel.”

Home media
The film was released on VHS in 1988 and on DVD in 2003.

References

External links
Hotel du Lac at the Internet Movie Database

1986 television films
1986 films
1980s British films
1980s English-language films
BAFTA winners (films)
BBC television dramas
British television films
Films based on British novels
Films directed by Giles Foster
Films scored by Carl Davis